Arthur Hopkins (1878–1950) was a Broadway theater director and producer.

Arthur Hopkins may also refer to:

 Arthur F. Hopkins (1794–1865), Justice of the Supreme Court of Alabama
 Arthur Hopkins (missionary), British missionary
 Dai Hopkins (footballer, born 1902) (Arthur David Hopkins, 1902–1943), Welsh footballer